Donald Monro may refer to:

 Donald Monro (physician) (1727–1802), Scottish physician and medical author
 Donald Monro (priest), Scottish clergyman and Archdeacon/Dean of the Isles

See also
 Donald Munro (disambiguation)
Donald Monroe (1888–1972), author